A half-truth is a deceptive statement that includes some element of truth. The statement might be partly true, the statement may be totally true, but only part of the whole truth, or it may use some deceptive element, such as improper punctuation, or double meaning, especially if the intent is to deceive, evade, blame or misrepresent the truth.

Purpose
The purpose and or consequence of a half-truth is to make something that is really only a belief appear to be knowledge, or a truthful statement to represent the whole truth or possibly lead to a false conclusion. The order in which the true and false information is presented in a "half-truth" can make a difference in ultimate believability. Barchetti and colleagues show that when two unrelated statements are but together with syntax that suggests causality, the statement is believed if the premise is true (even if the conclusion is unrelated or false).  Conversely, if the false statement is placed in the premise, the combined statement is less likely to be believed.  Thus order of presentation can influence the credibility of a half-true statement and has been named the half-truth effect. According to the justified true belief theory of knowledge, in order to know that a given proposition is true, one must not only believe in the relevant true proposition, but one must also have a good reason for doing so. A half-truth deceives the recipient by presenting something believable and using those aspects of the statement that can be shown to be true as a good reason to believe the statement is true in its entirety, or that the statement represents the whole truth. A person deceived by a half-truth considers the proposition to be knowledge and acts accordingly.

Examples
 In January 2018, U.S. President Donald Trump claimed on Twitter that "because of my policies, Black Unemployment has just been reported to be at the LOWEST RATE EVER RECORDED!" Although the unemployment rate for black Americans was indeed at a record low, the rate had been consistently decreasing since 2010, seven years before Trump took office.
 Using a technicality: Former U.S. President Bill Clinton famously engaged in a half-truth when he gave the testimony of "I did not have sexual relations with that woman, Miss Lewinsky." Here he engaged in an equivocation fallacy to deliberately indicate one particular meaning of the phrase "sexual relations", while intending another meaning, in order to deliberately mislead the court while still being able to later claim that "my statements were technically correct."
 The classic story about blind men and an elephant. Each blind man touches a different part of the elephant and reaches a different conclusion about the nature of the elephant; while each man's experience of the elephant is accurate, none of them have a full understanding of the nature of the beast. One may be touching the tail and believe that the elephant is long and thin, another may be touching the belly and say that it is round and big.

Politics
Some forms of half-truths are an inescapable part of politics in representative democracies. The reputation of a political candidate can be irreparably damaged if they are exposed in a lie, so a complex style of language has evolved to minimise the chance of this happening. If someone has not said something, they cannot be accused of lying. As a consequence, politics has become a world where half-truths are expected, and political statements are rarely accepted at face value.

William Safire defines a half-truth, for political purposes, as "a statement accurate enough to require an explanation; and the longer the explanation, the more likely a public reaction of half-belief".

It has been shown that the order of the half-truth makes a difference in reported belief in the statement. That is when a statement begins with a true statement followed by another unrelated statement (either true or false), the statement is believed. However, when the false statement is put in front, then the entire package is less believed regardless if the second part of the argument is true or false. 

In his 1990 work The Magic Lantern: The Revolution of 1989 Witnessed in Warsaw, Budapest, Berlin, and Prague, Timothy Garton Ash responded to Václav Havel's call for "living in truth":

Philosopher Alfred North Whitehead was quoted as saying: "There are no whole truths; all truths are half-truths. It is trying to treat them as whole truths that play the devil". If this is true, statements, or truths, which according to Whitehead are all half-truths, are susceptible to creating deceptive and false conclusions.

Meme theory
Richard Brodie links half-truths to memes, writing, "the truth of any proposition depends on the assumptions you make in considering it—the distinct memes you use in thinking about it". Brodie considers half-truths a necessary part of human interaction because they allow practical application of ideas when it is impractical to convey all the information needed to make a fully informed decision, although some half-truths can lead to false conclusions or inferences in the world of logic.

Quotations
The notion of half-truths has existed in various cultures, giving rise to several epigrammatic sayings.
 Karl Kraus, an Austrian journalist, critic, playwright, and poet noted, "An aphorism can never be the whole truth; it is either a half-truth or a truth-and-a-half."
 Arthur Koestler, a Hungarian-British author and journalist, wrote, "Two half-truths do not make a truth, and two half-cultures do not make a culture."

Selective truth 
Selective truth is an act for telling some part of truth selectively.  both intentionally or unintentionally.  

Both intentional and unintentional selective truth are not a truth at all.

Ethics and Morality 
While selective truth information is not the truth information, whether telling selective truth is consider as deceptive or lying and the morality are subject to debate. Some scholar think it is deceptive and lying and some scholar think are not.  Some philosopher consider selective truth deceptive but not lying.  Some philsopher simply consider it is not lying.

See also

 Alternative facts
 Casuistry
 Degree of truth
 Economical with the truth
 Fallacy of the single cause
 Fuzzy logic
 Jesuitical answer
 Jumping to conclusions
 Lie
 Limited hangout
 Minimisation (psychology)
 Modified limited hangout
 Multi-valued logic
 Omission bias
 Political correctness
 Principle of bivalence
 Quoting out of context
 Sophistry
 Truthiness
 Weasel word
 Cherry picking

References

External links

 SNSF research project Half-Truths. Truth, Fiction and Conspiracy in the 'Post-Factual Age', led by Prof. Dr. Nicola Gess (University of Basel, CH).
 Lying with Statistics – Examples of abuse of statistical, mathematical and scientific principles
 Half-Truths and the Development of Tax Policy 

Concepts in the philosophy of language
Propaganda techniques
Deception
Truth
Pejorative terms